Pan Wen-chieh (born 29 June 1992) is a Taiwanese footballer who currently plays as a goalkeeper for Taiwan Football Premier League club Taiwan Steel.

Club career
On 17 October 2019, it was announced that Pan had reached an agreement to join Hong Kong Premier League club Tai Po in January 2020. However, on 14 January 2020, Tai Po terminated their contract with Pan before he had ever suited up for the club.

References

1992 births
Living people
Taiwanese footballers
Chinese Taipei international footballers
Tatung F.C. players
Association football goalkeepers
Footballers at the 2018 Asian Games
Asian Games competitors for Chinese Taipei
Footballers from Taipei